The 2016–17 Hong Kong FA Cup (officially the 2016–17 CODEX FA Cup for sponsorship reasons) is the 42nd season of Hong Kong FA Cup. It is a knockout competition. Different from previous years, the preliminary round winners of lower league teams no longer enter the competition proper.

Bracket

Bold = winner
* = after extra time, = penalty shootout score

Fixtures and results

First Round

Quarter-finals

Semi-finals

Final

References

External links
FA Cup - Hong Kong Football Association

Fa Cup
Hong Kong FA Cup
2017